Cedar is a name.

Notable people and fictional characters with the name include:

Given name 
 Cedar Paul (1880–1972), née Gertrude Mary Davenport, British singer, author, translator and journalist
 Cedar Prest (born 1940), female stained glass artist from Australia
 Cedar Sigo (born 1978), American author
 Cedar Walton (1934–2013), American jazz pianist

Surname 
 Howard Cedar (born 1943), Israeli American biochemist
 Jon Cedar (1931–2011), American character actor, screenwriter and producer
 Joseph Cedar (born 1968), Israeli film director and screenwriter
 Larry Cedar (born 1955), American actor and a voice actor

Fictional characters 
 Cedar Wood, a character from Ever After High